History of health care may refer to 

 History of medicine
 History of hospitals
 History of nursing
 History of surgery
 History of pathology
 History of pharmacy
 History of psychiatric institutions
 History of hygiene
 History of water supply and sanitation
 History of universal health care
 Timeline of nursing history
 History of mental disorders
 Timeline of medicine and medical technology
 History of psychology
 History of psychiatry
 History of psychosurgery
 History of nutrition
 History of veterinary medicine
 Timeline of history of environmentalism
 History of health care reform in the United States